The 2015 National Pro Fastpitch season was the 12th season of professional softball under the name National Pro Fastpitch (NPF) for  the only professional women's softball league in the United States.  From 1997 to 2002, NPF operated under the names Women's Pro Fastpitch (WPF) and Women's Pro Softball League (WPSL). Each year, the playoff teams battle for the Cowles Cup.

Milestones and events
In January 2015, the NPF announced that the Dallas Charge would join the league as an expansion team.

The NPF and CBS Sports Network signed a 2015 agreement for the network to broadcast the NPF Draft, selected regular season games, and all of the NPF Championship Series.

The Pride's homestand against the Bandits, Rebellion, and Racers from July 15 to July 25 was broadcast on the Longhorn Network and was subsequently available for streaming on ESPN3.

On July 10, Cat Osterman pitched the fifth no-hitter of her NPF career, beating the Pennsylvania Rebellion 2-1. (The Rebellion scored their run in the first  inning without a hit, by combining two walks and three HBP.  Pennsylvania actually led 1-0 going to the 7th inning.)

On July 23, Monica Abbott pitched her second perfect game as a member of the Bandits, beating the Charge, 10-0.

On August 3, Monica Abbott pitched a no-hitter against the Pennsylvania Rebellion, winning 3-0.  The pursuit of a perfect game ended in the seventh inning, on a Chicago error and later a walk.

On August 8, Sarah Pauly became the first NPF pitcher to win 100 games.

Rule changes

The League Management Committee - consisting of Akron Racers owner Craig Stout, Chicago Bandits general manager Aaron Moore, Dallas Charge general manager Kevin Shelton, Pennsylvania Rebellion owner Stu Williams, and USSSA Pride general manager Don DeDonatis - met in Kissimmee, FL and voted on the following items:

 Voted unanimously to use, during doubleheaders, a tiebreaker in the 8th inning  due to the overall length of playing time that can take place on a double-header day. Motion was made to implement the tie breaker in the 8th inning of a "true" double header, meaning the same two teams playing each other on the same day, regardless of whether the match-up was scheduled in advance or the result of a make-up game.  The motion did not include the discussion of using a run-rule after 5 innings.
 Rejected a motion to use a "run-rule" of 8 runs after 5 innings.
 Voted to allow individual teams the option to conduct autograph sessions as they choose for the Home Team. (Visiting Team must continue to make all players available for autograph session.)
 Voted to allow backstops to exceed the current limit of 30' and to continue playing by rules implemented mid-season in 2014.
 Voted to require umpires to confiscate any and all broken bats that occur during a game and forward them immediately to the League Office. From there, they will be returned to manufacturers and tested to insure they meet regulatory standards. In the event the bat is assessed to be altered, player and team will be assessed appropriate fines.
 Voted to allow the continuance of no tiebreaker in Championship Series play, (acknowledging that for television or other special circumstances such as play delays, it may be implemented).
 Voted to raise the per diem for coaches, trainers and players from a $25 per day allowance to a $30 per day allowance ($6 Breakfast, $9 Lunch, $15 Dinner)
 Voted on sponsorship real estate inside ballpark venues for televised games to be used as follows:
From outfield side of dugout around the backstop to outfield side of other dugout belongs to the league if they desire or require to use. This will be for league branding, exclusive category branding and television sponsor branding.
From outfield side of dugout down the sidelines and around the outfield fence to the outfield side of the other dugout belongs to the home team if they desire or require to use.
 Exceptions may be made to the above.
 Voted to allow teams brand one sleeve of each and every uniform with a sponsor brand, if desired.
 Voted that beginning in 2015, only official suppliers will be allowed into the headband category and those will be the only headbands allowed on the field of play.
 Voted that logo sizing limitations will be distributed to Official Suppliers and must be adhered to on any and all equipment and apparel that makes the NPF playing field (which includes dugouts).
 Draft order was distributed including the addition of expansion Dallas. Dallas was offered a "Market Choice Selection," which they later used to acquire Renada Davis.
 Voted that the first item of the "Tie Breaking Procedure" to determine regular season standings would be deleted. This places "Head to head" as the first determiner in tie breaking.
 Agreed that a scheduling meeting (for 2016 schedule) would be held at the NFCA Convention in Atlanta in December 2015.

Teams, cities and stadiums

Other sites
The USSSA Florida Pride and Dallas Charge are scheduled to play a two-game series at CommunityAmerica Ballpark in Kansas City, Kansas on June 11 and 12, 2015.
The USSSA Florida Pride and Dallas Charge are scheduled to play a two-game series at University Field in Columbia, Missouri on June 15 and 16, 2015.
The USSSA Florida Pride and Dallas Charge are scheduled to play a two-game series at St. Mary's University in San Antonio, Texas, on August 6 and 7, 2015.
The USSSA Florida Pride and Pennsylvania Rebellion are scheduled to play a game at Santander Stadium in York, Pennsylvania June 25 and two games at Clipper Magazine Stadium in Lancaster, Pennsylvania June 26 and 27,2015.
The Dallas Charge and Akron Racers are scheduled to play a four-game series in Colorado at Twin Rivers Community Park in Greeley,  Erie Community Park in Erie, Christopher Fields in Westminster and Aurora Sports Park in Aurora from June 29-July 2, 2015.
The USSSA Florida Pride and Pennsylvania Rebellion are scheduled to play series at Ned Skeldon Stadium in Maumee, Ohio July 3 and 4, 2015.
The Dallas Charge and Akron Racers are scheduled to play a two-game series at Berliner Park in Columbus, Ohio July 17 and 18, 2015.  On August 1, 2015 at Berliner Park  Dallas Charge will play Akron Racers, immediately followed by Chicago Bandits playing the Pennsylvania Rebellion.
The USSSA Florida Pride and Chicago Bandits are scheduled to play a two-game series at Louisville Slugger Sports Complex in Peoria, Illinois July 29 and 30, 2015.
The USSSA Florida Pride and Dallas Charge are scheduled to play a two-game series at Constellation Field in Sugar Land, Texas August 3 and 4, 2015.

Player acquisition

College draft

The 2015 NPF College Draft was held on Wednesday, April 1, 2015, 5:30 pm CST at the CMA Theater in the Country Music Hall of Fame and Museum in Nashville, Tennessee.  Lauren Chamberlain of Oklahoma was selected first by USSSA Florida Pride. Draft order was determined by regular season standings from 2014, but subsequent trades and transactions altered the overall draft order.

Notable transactions

 Monica Abbott re-signed with Chicago Bandits for 2015 season.

League standings 
Through 8/10/15 Source:

Results table 

All stats come from

Game notes

NPF Championship

The 2015 NPF Championship was scheduled to be played at Hoover Metropolitan Stadium in Hoover, AL beginning August 15.  This is the second time Hoover has hosted the championship.  The top four teams from the regular season qualify for the championship playoffs. The highest-seeded semifinal winner then hosted the championship final.

Championship Game

Statistical leaders 

Batting avg

Slugging pct

On base pct

Runs scored

Hits

Runs batted in

Home runs

Stolen bases

Earned run avg

Batters struck out

Wins

Saves  

Losses

Annual awards
The 2015 NPF Awards Banquet was held at the Hyatt Regency Wynfrey Hotel in Hoover, Alabama on August 13. The annual awards were presented, and the 2015 All-NPF Team was announced.

Notes

All-NPF Team

See also

 List of professional sports leagues
 List of professional sports teams in the United States and Canada

References

External links 
 

Softball teams
Softball in the United States
2015 in women's softball
2015 in American women's sports